Marco Antonio Cornaro or Marcantonio Corner (1583–1639) was a Roman Catholic prelate who served as Bishop of Padua (1632–1639).

Biography
Marco Antonio Cornaro was born in Venice, Italy in 1583.
On 15 November 1632, he was appointed during the papacy of Pope Urban VIII as Bishop of Padua.
On 30 November 1632, he was consecrated bishop by Antonio Marcello Barberini, Cardinal-Priest of Sant'Onofrio, with Benedetto Landi, Bishop Emeritus of Fossombrone, and Angelo Castellari, Bishop of Caorle, serving as co-consecrators. 
He served as Bishop of Padua until his death in 1639.

References

External links and additional sources
 (for Chronology of Bishops) 
 (for Chronology of Bishops) 

17th-century Roman Catholic bishops in the Republic of Venice
Bishops appointed by Pope Urban VIII
Marco Antonio
1583 births
1639 deaths